Heinrich Gustav Johannes Kayser ForMemRS (16 March 1853  – 14 October 1940) was a German physicist and spectroscopist.

Biography
Kayser was born at Bingen am Rhein. Kayser's early work was concerned with the characteristics of acoustic waves. He discovered the occurrence of helium in the Earth's atmosphere in 1868 during a solar eclipse when he detected a new spectral line in the solar spectrum. In 1881 Kayser coined the word “adsorption”. Together with Carl Runge, he examined the spectra of chemical elements. In 1905, he wrote a paper on electron theory.

The kayser unit, associated with wavenumber, of the CGS system was named after him. He died at Bonn in 1940.

Works
 Lehrbuch der Physik für Studierende . Enke, Stuttgart 3rd ed. 1900 Digital edition by the University and State Library Düsseldorf

References

External links

1853 births
1940 deaths
Foreign Members of the Royal Society
20th-century German physicists
People from Mainz-Bingen
Academic staff of the University of Bonn
People from Rhenish Hesse
19th-century German physicists
Spectroscopists